is a 2008 Japanese film written and directed by Kōki Mitani.

According to photography experts, "the golden hour, sometimes called the 'magic hour', is roughly the first hour of light after sunrise, and the last hour of light before sunset, although the exact duration varies between seasons. During these times the sun is low in the sky, producing a soft, diffused light which is much more flattering than the harsh midday sun."

In photography and cinematography, the magic hour is only a moment and the most beautiful time of the day, when afterglow of a sunset lights up around. By extension in this film, it means "the most glittering years of everyone's life".

A Chinese remake, Too Cool to Kill, was released in 2022.

Overview
 This film marks film director Kon Ichikawa's last appearance and was dedicated in his memory. (This message can be seen in the end of this film.) In this film, movie director played by Kon Ichikawa is shooting Kuroi Hyaku-ichi-nin no Onna, a parody of  Kuroi Ju-nin no Onna. (discussed later)
 Shingo Katori who played in The Uchōten Hotel makes a cameo appearance as the same role in this film.
 There are three short short films within a film.
 Kuroi Hyaku-ichi-nin no Onna
 A potential sequel parody of Kon Ichikawa's work Kuroi Ju-nin no Onna (cast:Kiichi Nakai, Yūki Amami and hundred women, AD Koji Yamamoto)
 Ankokugai no Yojinbo (cast: Shōsuke Tanihara, Kyōka Suzuki, Yasuhumi Terawaki, Keisuke Horibe)
 Jitsuroku Muho-chitai (cast:Toshiaki Karasawa)
 With regards to its cinematic impact on Japanese and Asian cinema, The Magic Hour was nominated for the 2009 Japanese Academy Awards in eight categories (best actor, best art direction, best director, best editing, best film, best film score, best screenplay, best sound) and for the 2009 Asian Film Awards in three categories (best actress, best production designer, best screenwriter).

Plot summary
When a low-level gangster (Satoshi Tsumabuki) is caught having an affair with his boss's wife (Eri Fukatsu), he pleads for his life by promising his boss (Toshiyuki Nishida) that he will recruit a famous hitman.  When it quickly becomes apparent that he is never going to find the wanted hitman, he hires an actor (Kōichi Satō) to fill the role.

For much of the movie, the actor playing the hitman believes that he has been hired to play a part in a seemingly arcane gangster movie, and interacts with the other gangsters as though they are also hired actors.  At times, this puts his employer (Satoshi Tsumabuki) in a precarious position.

Box office
The film grossed  in Japan. It also grossed $300,475 in other Asian territories, for a total of  grossed in Asia.

Cast
 Kōichi Satō as Taiki Murata
 Satoshi Tsumabuki as Noboru Bingo
 Toshiyuki Nishida as Kosuke Teshio
 Haruka Ayase as Natsuko Shikama
 Eri Fukatsu as Mari Takachiho

References

External links
 
 http://www.varietyasiaonline.com/content/view/1728/53/
 http://twitchfilm.net/site/view/koki-mitani-returns-with-the-magic-hour/
 https://www.imdb.com/title/tt1077089/

Films directed by Kōki Mitani
Japanese comedy films
Films with screenplays by Kôki Mitani
2000s Japanese films
Films produced by Kazutoshi Wadakura